Ivan Perović (born 17 September 1991) is a Serbian volleyball player who formerly competed under OK Nis and VK Spartak, and GEN-i-Volley. He is 193 cm tall, and he is playing as an outside hitter.

Clubs

External links 
 Ivan Perović - profile on World of Volley

References 

1991 births
Living people
Serbian men's volleyball players
Sportspeople from Kragujevac
Serbian expatriate sportspeople in Slovakia
Serbian expatriate sportspeople in Lebanon
Serbian expatriate sportspeople in Slovenia